The 1976–77 NBA season was the Lakers' 29th season in the NBA and 17th season in Los Angeles.

Offseason

Draft picks

Roster

Regular season

Season standings

z – clinched division title
y – clinched division title
x – clinched playoff spot

Record vs. opponents

Playoffs

|- align="center" bgcolor="#ccffcc"
| 1
| April 20
| Golden State
| W 115–106
| Kareem Abdul-Jabbar (27)
| Kareem Abdul-Jabbar (16)
| Kareem Abdul-Jabbar (7)
| The Forum15,928
| 1–0
|- align="center" bgcolor="#ccffcc"
| 2
| April 22
| Golden State
| W 95–86
| Kareem Abdul-Jabbar (40)
| Kareem Abdul-Jabbar (19)
| Cazzie Russell (7)
| The Forum17,505
| 2–0
|- align="center" bgcolor="#ffcccc"
| 3
| April 24
| @ Golden State
| L 105–109
| Kareem Abdul-Jabbar (28)
| Abdul-Jabbar, Ford (14)
| Abdul-Jabbar, Chaney (7)
| Oakland–Alameda County Coliseum Arena13,155
| 2–1
|- align="center" bgcolor="#ffcccc"
| 4
| April 26
| @ Golden State
| L 103–114
| Kareem Abdul-Jabbar (41)
| Kareem Abdul-Jabbar (18)
| Tom Abernethy (5)
| Oakland–Alameda County Coliseum Arena13,155
| 2–2
|- align="center" bgcolor="#ccffcc"
| 5
| April 29
| Golden State
| W 112–105
| Kareem Abdul-Jabbar (45)
| Kareem Abdul-Jabbar (18)
| Don Chaney (6)
| The Forum17,505
| 3–2
|- align="center" bgcolor="#ffcccc"
| 6
| May 1
| @ Golden State
| L 106–115
| Kareem Abdul-Jabbar (43)
| Kareem Abdul-Jabbar (20)
| Lucius Allen (7)
| Oakland–Alameda County Coliseum Arena13,155
| 3–3
|- align="center" bgcolor="#ccffcc"
| 7
| May 4
| Golden State
| W 97–84
| Kareem Abdul-Jabbar (36)
| Kareem Abdul-Jabbar (26)
| Bo Lamar (6)
| The Forum17,505
| 4–3
|-

|- align="center" bgcolor="#ffcccc"
| 1
| May 6
| Portland
| L 109–121
| Earl Tatum (32)
| Kareem Abdul-Jabbar (10)
| Abdul-Jabbar, Warner (5)
| The Forum16,975
| 0–1
|- align="center" bgcolor="#ffcccc"
| 2
| May 8
| Portland
| L 97–99
| Kareem Abdul-Jabbar (40)
| Kareem Abdul-Jabbar (17)
| three players tied (5)
| The Forum15,192
| 0–2
|- align="center" bgcolor="#ffcccc"
| 3
| May 10
| @ Portland
| L 97–102
| Kareem Abdul-Jabbar (21)
| Kareem Abdul-Jabbar (20)
| Kareem Abdul-Jabbar (7)
| Memorial Coliseum12,926
| 0–3
|- align="center" bgcolor="#ffcccc"
| 4
| May 13
| @ Portland
| L 101–105
| Kareem Abdul-Jabbar (30)
| Kareem Abdul-Jabbar (17)
| Lucius Allen (6)
| Memorial Coliseum12,904
| 0–4
|-

Awards and records
 Kareem Abdul-Jabbar, NBA Most Valuable Player Award
 Kareem Abdul-Jabbar, All-NBA First Team
 Kareem Abdul-Jabbar, NBA All-Defensive Second Team
 Kareem Abdul-Jabbar, NBA All-Star Game
 Don Chaney, NBA All-Defensive Second Team

References

Los Angeles Lakers seasons
Los Angeles Lakers
Los Angle
Los Angle